The RASopathies are developmental syndromes caused by germline mutations (or in rare cases by somatic mosaicism) in genes that alter the Ras subfamily and mitogen-activated protein kinases that control signal transduction, including:
 Capillary malformation-AV malformation syndrome
 Autoimmune lymphoproliferative syndrome
 Cardiofaciocutaneous syndrome
 Hereditary gingival fibromatosis type 1
 Neurofibromatosis type 1
 Noonan syndrome
 Costello syndrome, Noonan-like
 Legius syndrome, Noonan-like
 Noonan syndrome with multiple lentigines, formerly called LEOPARD syndrome, Noonan-like
 SYNGAP1-related intellectual disability

References

Autosomal dominant disorders
Congenital vascular defects
Deficiencies of intracellular signaling peptides and proteins
Developmental neuroscience
Enzyme defects
Genodermatoses
Gross pathology
Lymphocytic immune system disorders
Melanocytic nevi and neoplasms
Neuro-cardio-facial-cutaneous syndromes
Neurological disorders
Syndromes
RASopathies
Valvular heart disease